Ajania is a genus of flowering plants in the daisy family, described as a genus in 1955. The genus is native to temperate Asia, primarily Russia and China. It is named after the Russian port city Ayan in the Khabarovsk Krai region of the Russian Far East, on the coast of the Sea of Okhotsk.

Species
, Kew's Plants of the World Online accepts 43 species in the genus Ajania:

References

Anthemideae
Asteraceae genera